Shâd'havâr (Arabic: شادهوار) or Âras (آرس) is a legendary creature from medieval Muslim bestiaries resembling a unicorn. Al-Qazwini said that it lives in the country of Rūm (Byzantium) and that it has one horn with 42 hollow branches which, when the wind passes through them, produces a pleasant sound that makes the animals sit around and listen. Horns of those creatures, sometimes gifted to kings, can be played like flutes. When played on one side, they produce a cheerful sound, and when on the other, the music is so sad it makes people cry.

The scholar Al-Damiri stated a larger number of branches to 72, and al-Mustawfi made shadhavar a ferocious carnivore. The change can be explained as a result of merging its description with another creature from Qazwini, the Sirânis (سيرانس), a predator that plays music to lure its victims. G. Jacob pointed out similarities between the Sirânis and the sirens from Greek mythology.

Bibliography
 Ettinghausen, Richard. The Unicorn: Studies in Muslim Iconography. Freer Gallery of Art. Occasional Papers 1. pp. 64–66.

Arabian legendary creatures
Middle Eastern mythology
Unicorns
Byzantine Empire